The 2012–13 América season was the 66th professional season of Mexico's top-flight football league. The season is split into two tournaments—the Torneo Apertura and the Torneo Clausura—each with identical formats and each contested by the same eighteen teams. América began their season on July 21, 2012 against Monterrey, América played most of their homes games on Saturdays at 5:00pm local time.

On May 26, 2013, América won the eleventh league title in their history by defeating Cruz Azul 4–2 on penalty kicks after a comeback from a 0–1 first leg loss to tie 2–2 on aggregate. With this, América become the most successful club, along with Guadalajara, in Mexico.

Torneo Apertura

Squad

Out on loan

Regular season

Apertura 2012 results

Final phase

América advanced 3–2 on aggregate

Toluca advanced 3–2 on aggregate

Goalscorers

Regular season

Source:

Final phase

Results

Results summary

Results by round

Apertura 2012 Copa MX

Group stage

Apertura results

Goalscorers

Results

Results by round

Torneo Clausura

Squad

Regular season

Clausura 2013 results

Final phase

América advanced 3–1 on aggregate

América advanced 4–3 on aggregate

América won 4–2 on penalties

Goalscorers

Regular season

Source:

Final phase

Results

Results summary

Results by round

Clausura 2013 Copa MX

Group stage

Clausura results

Knockout stage

Goalscorers

Results

Results by round

References

Mexican football clubs 2012–13 season
2012-13